Kiab Sar (also Romanized as Kīāb Sar; also known as Kīā Besar) is a village in Mianrud Rural District, Chamestan District, Nur County, Mazandaran Province, Iran. At the 2006 census, its population was 225, in 52 families.

References 

Populated places in Nur County